Viktoria "Vicki" Schwarz (born 2 July 1985 in Linz) is an Austrian sprint canoer who has competed since the mid-2000s. She has won three medals in the K-2 500 m event at the ICF Canoe Sprint World Championships, a gold in 2011, a silver in 2005 and a bronze in 2010.  The silver medal was won with Petra Schlitzer, while the gold and bronze were won with Yvonne Schuring.

Schwarz and Schuring also finished ninth in the K-2 500 m event at the 2008 Summer Olympics in Beijing.  At the 2012 Summer Olympics, the team of Schwarz and Schuring improved to 5th place.

References

Sports-reference.com profile

1985 births
Austrian female canoeists
Canoeists at the 2008 Summer Olympics
Canoeists at the 2012 Summer Olympics
Canoeists at the 2016 Summer Olympics
Living people
Olympic canoeists of Austria
ICF Canoe Sprint World Championships medalists in kayak
Sportspeople from Linz
European Games competitors for Austria
Canoeists at the 2019 European Games
Canoeists at the 2020 Summer Olympics
21st-century Austrian women